Frederica (French: Frédérica) is a 1942 French comedy film directed by Jean Boyer and starring Charles Trenet, Elvire Popesco and Jacqueline Gauthier. It is based on a play by Jean de Letraz.

Synopsis
Gilbert Legrant a singer and owner of a cabaret is financially bailed out by his girlfriend Lilette. However, she is outraged when she discovers love letters written by him to a woman named Frederica. Frederica is in fact a fictional creation of his ideal woman, but Lilette doesn't believe him. Gilbert's friend gets his own girlfriend Claudine to pose as Frederica, while in turn a real Frederica arrives from Davos causing further confusion.

Cast
 Charles Trenet as Gilbert Legrant
 Elvire Popesco as Frédérica
 Rellys as Théodule
 Jacqueline Gauthier as Claudine 
 Jacques Louvigny as Le baron 
 Hélène Tossy as La vendeuse
 Hélène Dartigue as Anaïs
 Maurice Baquet as Un ami de Gilbert
 Francis Blanche as Ami de Gilbert
 Suzet Maïs as Lilette
 Christian Gérard as Un ami de Gilbert 
 Robert Arnoux as Julien Blanchet

References

Bibliography 
 Bessy, Maurice & Chirat, Raymond. ''Histoire du cinéma français: encyclopédie des films, 1940–1950. Pygmalion, 1986

External links 
 

1942 films
1942 comedy films
French comedy films
1940s French-language films
Films directed by Jean Boyer
French films based on plays
1940s French films